Hampton is a town in Kings County, New Brunswick, Canada.

Located on the Kennebecasis River 30 kilometres northeast of Saint John, Hampton is the shire town of Kings County.  It functioned as the seat of county government between 1870 and 1965 (when county governments were abolished) and is today a service centre for the central Kennebecasis River valley, as well as being a suburb of Saint John. Hampton also has its own RCMP detachment that was built in 1999.

On 1 January 2023, Hampton was greatly enlarged by annexing all or part of four local service districts; revised census figures have not been released.

History

The area in which the town of Hampton is located had been inhabited by French settlers in the 1600s while First Nations had called it home since time immemorial. The United Empire Loyalists were the first to establish permanent settlements in the area shortly after arriving in 1783. It was in 1785 that Kings County was established in NB and in 1795 the Parish of Hampton was created out of parts of Sussex and Kingston parishes. One area of the town, known now as the Lower Norton Shore, was originally known as the Yankee Shore because of all the Loyalist immigrants in the 1780s.

By 1871 Hampton had a population of 250. By 1904 it grew to 800. These people had a post office, three stores, three hotels, a match factory, a grist mill, a saw mill and three churches. At this time was included the community of Hampton Ferry (population 150) and the village of Ossekeag (Hampton Station) which had a population of 500 and was home to a post office, seven stores, a hotel, a machine shop and four churches. It was also the site of a station on the Intercontinental Railway and a junction on the Hampton-St. Martin's railway. The name Ossekeag is Mi'kmaq for "marshy brook"

Hampton was incorporated as a village in 1966. It became a town in 1991.

Hampton is located in the Kennebecasis River valley, where the river flows into a wide flood plain.  The Hampton Marshes contain a diverse assortment of wildlife and are one of the town's major tourist attractions.  Although Hampton is located far upstream from the Bay of Fundy, its high tides have some effect there nonetheless.  The marshes flood every spring during the run-off, and then the water levels vary during the course of the year, offering a constantly changing landscape for different animals, birds and fish.  In late years, the marshes have suffered from an invasion of Purple Loosestrife.

Notable people

The town of Hampton is the birthplace of: John Peters Humphrey, (one of the drafters of the Universal Declaration of Human Rights); artist and sculptor John Hooper; MLA Bev Harrison; Colin Jardine, bassist for folk punk band, Sleepy PUNK; NHL referee Tim Peel; singer/songwriter Jessica Rhaye; journalist/New Brunswick author Dorothy Dearborn; and journalist/New Brunswick author Stuart D. Trueman.

Steve Fossett once made a crash landing outside Hampton, in an aborted attempt to be the first balloonist to fly solo non-stop around the world. The Solo Challenger departed Stratobowl, South Dakota, on January 8, 1996.  Fossett called it "the most embarrassing day of my life," but a woman from the town thought otherwise. Forcing her way through the crowd that gathered, she offered him a miniature Canadian flag. "Welcome to Canada," she said. Fossett sighed wearily and thanked her.

As the shire town of the county, Hampton is also home to the Kings Co. Museum and Gaol

Government
Hampton is administered by an elected mayor and town council.  For the term May 2008 to May 2012, the council consists of:
Mayor:        Robert "Dewey" Doucet;
Deputy Mayor: Jeremy Salgado;
Councillors:   Ken Chorley, Todd Beach and Kim Tompkins

Gary Crossman (PC) represents Hampton in the provincial legislature.

At the federal level, Hampton is located in the riding of Fundy Royal. The current Member of Parliament is Rob Moore of the Conservative Party of Canada.

Education
Hampton New Brunswick has four different schools: Dr. A.T. Leatherbarrow Primary School, Hampton Elementary School, Hampton Middle School, and Hampton High School. Their High School is represented by a variety of athletic teams including basketball, soccer, golf, football, hockey, and track and field. Their athletic mascot is the Hampton Husky.

Transportation
Highways in Hampton include Route 1, Route 100, Route 121, and Route 845. There is a modern roundabout in the town centre.

The community obtained rail service in 1859 with the opening of the European and North American Railway to Saint John, connecting to Moncton in 1860. Passenger service continued until 1994. The tracks are still in use for freight, as Canadian National Railways operate them as a secondary mainline. There was also rail service to St. Martins in the late nineteenth century on the Hampton and St. Martins Railway.

Demographics

Population trend 

Religious make-up (2001)

Income (2006)

Mother tongue language (2006)

Photo gallery

References

External links

Official Website

 
Communities in Greater Saint John
Towns in New Brunswick